Zafar Karachiwala is an Indian actor who starred in the television programme Hip Hip Hurray (TV series) as Rafay (aired on Zee TV).

Films
 Zakhm (1998)
 Manasarovar (2004) as George
 Chai Pani Etc (2004) as Satya Kumar
 Bye Bye Miss Goodnight (2005) as Rocky
 A Mighty Heart (2007) male guest-1
 Superstar (2008) as journalist
 Ek Tho Chance (2009)
 Delhi Belly (2011)
 Rashmi Rocket (2021)

References

External links
 
 Zafar Karachiwala at Bollywood Hungama

Year of birth missing (living people)
Living people
Indian male film actors
Indian male television actors
Male actors in Hindi cinema
Male actors from Karachi
Dawoodi Bohras
Male actors from Mumbai